ǂAakhoe (ǂĀkhoe) and Haiǁom are part of the Khoekhoe dialect continuum and are spoken mainly in Namibia. In the sparsely available material on the subject, ǂAkhoe and Haiǁom have been considered a variant of the Khoekhoe language, as separate dialects (Haacke et al. 1997), as virtual synonyms of a single variant (Heikinnen, n.d.), or as "a way in which some Haiǁom speak their language in the northern part of Namibia" (Widlock, n.d.). ǂAkhoe especially is intermediate between the Khoekhoe and Kalahari branches of the Khoe language family.

The people
The Haiǁom are traditionally hunter-gatherers, and many aspects of this traditional culture have been preserved in spite of the political, economic, and linguistic marginalisation of the group. Characteristical features of their culture include healing trance dances, hunting magic, intensive usage of wild plant and insect food, a unique kinship and naming system, frequent storytelling, and the use of a landscape-term system for spatial orientation.

The Haiǁom live in the savannah of northern Namibia, in an area stretching from the edges of Etosha salt pan and the northern white farming areas as far as the Angola border – and perhaps beyond – in the north and Kavango in the east. 
According to Ethnologue there were 52,000 Haiǁom speakers in 2016.

Grammar
In theory ǂAkhoe possesses free word order, with the subject–object–verb order (SOV) being the dominant preference. In keeping with the typological profile of SOV languages, adjectives, demonstratives and numerals generally precede nouns. Nouns are marked by person–gender–number (PGN) markers.  Adjectives, demonstratives and numerals all agree with their head noun.

Mãa is an interrogative used freely in Haiǁom, the subject |ũ takes the suffix -ba, which is a PGN marker denoting the 3rd person masculine singular. The indirect object nde, a demonstrative, follows the noun, and is inflected in concord with the head noun.

Compound structures are highly productive in ǂAkhoe and vary widely in the combination of word categories. The possibilities include: noun+noun, noun+adverb or vice versa, noun+adjective or vice versa, adjective+adjective, adjective+adverb or vice versa, adjective+suffix, or multiple combinations of the above.

Phonology
Comparing Heikinnen's and Widlock's contribution to ǂAkhoe phonology with the more general and theoretical phonological work of Peter Ladefoged (1996), ǂAkhoe can be said to have 47 phonemes. However, an in-depth phonological sketch of the language might show other results where the vowels are concerned.

Consonants
There are 34 consonants in ǂAkhoe, 20 of which are clicks produced with an ingressive airstream, and 14 of which are pulmonic consonants produced with an egressive airstream.

Vowels
ǂAkhoe Haiǁom has a total of 12 vowel phonemes. These can be divided into monophthongs and diphthongs, with a further subdivision into oral and nasal pronunciation.

See also
 Original People's Party of Namibia, a political party in colonial Namibia led by Theophilus Soroseb, a member of the Haiǁom and Ovambo groups

References

Bibliography
Haacke, W. (1988) Nama|Damara I, Guide 2: Morphology and syntax, mimeographed.
Haacke, W., E. Eiseb, L. Namaseb (1997) "Internal and External Relations of Khoekhoe Dialects, a Preliminary Survey", in W. Haacke and E. Elderkin (eds.), Namibian Languages: Reports and Papers, Köln: Köppe.
Heikinnen, T. (n.d.), "A Description of the language of ≠Akhoen", unpublished manuscript.
Ladefoged, Peter & Maddieson, Ian (1996) The sounds of the world's languages, Oxford: Blackwell.
Widlock, T. (n.d.) A Haiǁom sourcebook: The T. Heikinnen Papers, unpublished manuscript.

External links

 Haiom in the Etosha region: a history of colonial settlement, ethnicity and Nature Conservation via Google Books
Undiscovered or Overlooked: The Haiom of Namibia

Khoe languages
Languages of South Africa
Languages of Botswana
Languages of Namibia
Ethnic groups in Namibia